Timothy Kast (born August 19, 1988) is a Swiss professional ice hockey forward who is currently playing with EHC Olten of the Swiss League (SL). He previously played with EV Zug, Genève-Servette HC and SC Bern.

Playing career
Kast made his National League A debut playing with Genève-Servette HC during the 2007–08 NLA season.

On November 21, 2016, Kast signed a two-year contract with EV Zug worth CHF 1 million for the 2017–18 and 2018–19 season.

On June 1, 2018, it was announced that Kast would re-join Genève-Servette for the 2018–19 season on a one-year deal, despite one year remaining on his contract with EV Zug. Kast appeared in 48 regular season games with Zug -tallying 13 points (3 goals)- as well as 5 playoffs games.

References

External links

1988 births
Living people
EHC Basel players
SC Bern players
HC Fribourg-Gottéron players
Ice hockey people from Geneva
Genève-Servette HC players
HC La Chaux-de-Fonds players
Lausanne HC players
EHC Olten players
Swiss ice hockey forwards
EV Zug players